Lieutenant General Ernest Ker Squires  (18 December 1882 – 2 March 1940) was a senior officer in the Australian Army who served as Chief of the General Staff (1939–1940).

Biography
Squires was born in India, son of clergyman Rev. Robert Alfred Squires and Elizabeth Anne (nee Ker). Educated at Eton College and the Royal Military Academy, Woolwich, Squires was commissioned into the Royal Engineers in 1903. He transferred to the 3rd Sappers and Miners in India in 1905. On 3 March 1912 he married at Westgate-on-Sea, Kent, Ethel Elsie Risley.

Squires served in the First World War and was wounded at Givenchy in 1914 and at Ypres in 1915. Later that year he saw action again – this time in Mesopotamia, and in the Third Anglo-Afghan War in 1919. During these five years, he was awarded the Military Cross, the Distinguished Service Order, and mentioned in despatches six times. In 1932 he was made brigadier on the General Staff of Southern Command.

Squires became Director of Staff Duties at the War Office in 1936, Inspector General of the Australian Army in 1938, and Chief of the General Staff in 1939. His health failed him and he died early the following year after cancer surgery in St Ives Private Hospital, East Melbourne. He was cremated at Springvale Crematorium, Melbourne, and is commemorated on the Commonwealth War Graves Commission's Victoria Cremation Memorial there.

References

1882 births
1940 deaths
Australian generals
Australian military personnel of World War II
British Army generals
British Army personnel of World War I
Deaths from cancer in Victoria (Australia)
Companions of the Distinguished Service Order
Companions of the Order of the Bath
Graduates of the Royal Military Academy, Woolwich
People educated at Eton College
Recipients of the Military Cross
Royal Engineers officers
British people in colonial India
British emigrants to Australia